

Yaakov "Kobi" Lichtenstein (born 1964) is an Israeli-Brazilian master of krav maga who introduced this technique to South America. He is the President of the South American Federation of Krav Maga (FSAKM).

Early life
Lichtenstein was born in 1964 in Rehovot, Israel. He began training in the martial art of krav maga in 1967 under its founder, Imi Lichtenfeld (1910–1998). Lichtenstein began teaching the art at the age of 15. He served for three years in the Israeli Defense Forces, by the end he held a black belt diploma from the Krav Maga Association. He fought in the First Lebanon War (1982).

Brazil
Lichtenstein arrived in Brazil on 18 January 1990, appointed by Lichtenfeld to introduce his martial art to South America. He has written at least three books on krav maga, including Krav Maga: A filosofia da defesa Israelense (Krav Maga: The Philosophy of the Israeli Defense) and Krav Maga: Sua defesa pessoal contra a violência urbana (Krav Maga: Your self-defense against urban violence). In January 1996, Lichtenfeld promoted Lichtenstein to the rank of 6th dan in krav maga.

In March 2009, Lichtenstein received the Tiradentes Medal. On 15 May 2009, he received the Pedro Ernesto Medal in recognition of his service to krav maga in Brazil. Lichtenstein lives and teaches krav maga in Rio de Janeiro, Brazil.

In the middle of 2011, Lichtenstein was granted an 8th dan red belt by Haim Zut and Uri Refaeli from the Krav Maga Federation.

References

Living people
1964 births
Krav Maga practitioners
People from Rehovot
Brazilian Jews
Brazilian male mixed martial artists
Sportspeople from Rio de Janeiro (city)
Israeli emigrants to Brazil
Israeli Jews